John McLellan Johnson (August 20, 1930 – June 25, 2009) was a politician in Ontario, Canada. He was a Progressive Conservative member who served in the Legislative Assembly of Ontario from 1975 to 1990. He represented the ridings of Wellington—Dufferin—Peel and Wellington.

Background
Johnson was educated at Ryerson Polytechnical School in Toronto, and worked as a retail merchant. Johnson married Marie Lynn "Marnie" Johnston in 1951. She died in Mount Forest in September 2008. Together they raised three children.

Politics
He was a councillor in the Town of Mount Forest from 1968 to 1973, and mayor from 1973 to 1975.

He was elected to the Ontario legislature in the 1975 provincial election, defeating Liberal candidate Ted Sibbald by 712 votes in the riding of Wellington—Dufferin—Peel.  He was re-elected by greater margins in the elections of 1977, 1981 and 1985.  In the 1987 provincial election, he defeated Liberal challenger Bill Benson by 463 votes in the redistributed riding of Wellington.

Johnson served as a backbench supporter of the governments of Bill Davis and Frank Miller from 1975 to 1985. He served as Chair of Caucus 1986-1990 and Deputy Opposition Whip. He did not seek re-election in 1990.

Later life
Johnson was appointed to the Alcohol and Gaming Commission of Ontario Board of Directors in 2003, during the administration of Conservative Premier Ernie Eves.

References

External links
 

1930 births
2009 deaths
Mayors of places in Ontario
Progressive Conservative Party of Ontario MPPs